The Land is Ours is a British land rights campaign advocating access to the land, its resources, and the planning processes set up in 1995 by George Monbiot and others.

History 
Their first campaign was the occupation of the disused Wisley Airfield in Surrey by 400 people in 1995, from which there was a live broadcast on the BBC's Newsnight programme. Nearby St. George's Hill is symbolically significant as the site of a 1649 protest, when the Diggers planted vegetables on the common land there.

Throughout the summer of 1996, the group set up Pure Genius!!, an eco-village on a derelict former distillery site owned by Guinness in Wandsworth, London. The squatted community was evicted the day before the London Wildlife Trust were meeting to officially designate it as a conservation site containing many species of flowers and birds classed as extremely rare in London.

On 1 April 1999, on the 350th anniversary of Gerrard Winstanley and the Diggers' occupation of the same hill, The Land Is Ours organised a rally, then occupied land at St. Georges Hill near Weybridge, Surrey.

In April 2004, The Land Is Ours occupied Castell Henllys, a tourist site with reconstructed Iron Age roundhouses, in protest at Pembrokeshire Coast National Park's decision to demolish That Roundhouse at nearby Brithdir Mawr.

Influence 
In 2009, a group inspired by The Land Is Ours opened Kew Bridge Eco Village, a squat on land owned by property developers St George; this was evicted on 27 May 2010.

The Land Magazine 
The Land Magazine is a magazine, published by The Land Is Ours, about landrights, at Monkton Wyld Court, Dorset.

See also
 Commons
 Freedom to roam
 Public land

References

External links
The Land is Ours website
The Land is Ours email list
The Land Magazine
https://tlio.gn.apc.org/contact-chapter-7/
TheLandIsOurs yahoo groups
Diggers 350  UK Squatting and Land Rights email information/article sharing and discussion service list, began in 1999
The Story of the Land on George Monbiot's website.
Video from Pure Genius campaign
 

Environmental organisations based in the United Kingdom
Land rights movements